Kliment Andreyevich Kolesnikov (born 9 July 2000) is a Russian swimmer. He holds world junior records in eight events: 50/100/200 back in long course, as well as 200 free, 50/100/200 back and 100 IM in short course.

He made his debut at the 2017 World Aquatics Championships, where he competed in three backstroke events and set two world junior records. In December 2017, he set a short course 100m backstroke world record at Vladimir Salnikov Cup, becoming the first swimmer born in the 2000s to hold a world record in an individual event.

He won a total of six medals (3 gold, 2 silver and 1 bronze) at the 2018 European Championships and established a new 50m backstroke world record.

At the 2018 Summer Youth Olympics, Kolesnikov was chosen the flag bearer for Russia. He won a total of six gold medals there.

Personal bests

Long course

Short course

Note WR= World Record, WJR= World Junior Record, ER= European Record, NR= Russian National Record, LC= Long course, SC= Short course, r= relay lead-off

References

External links

2000 births
Living people
Russian male swimmers
Swimmers from Moscow
Male backstroke swimmers
Russian male freestyle swimmers
European Aquatics Championships medalists in swimming
Swimmers at the 2018 Summer Youth Olympics
Swimmers at the 2020 Summer Olympics
Medalists at the 2020 Summer Olympics
Olympic silver medalists in swimming
Olympic bronze medalists in swimming
World record holders in swimming
World Aquatics Championships medalists in swimming
Youth Olympic gold medalists for Russia
Olympic silver medalists for the Russian Olympic Committee athletes
Olympic bronze medalists for the Russian Olympic Committee athletes
Olympic swimmers of Russia